The 1967–68 season of the Philadelphia 76ers was their 15th season in the National Basketball Association (NBA) and their fifth season since moving from Syracuse (as well as their first season at their new home in South Philadelphia, the Spectrum). The 76ers finished the regular season with a record of 62–20, and for the third straight year had the best record in the entire NBA.

In the playoffs, they eliminated the New York Knicks in the Eastern Conference Semifinals, 4 games to 2. The series win proved costly, as Billy Cunningham, their sixth man, injured his non-shooting wrist and was out for the remainder of the playoffs.

In the Eastern Conference Finals, the Sixers became the first team in NBA history to blow a 3–1 series lead as they lost to the Boston Celtics in 7 games. What was so damaging about this series loss was that Games 5 and 7 were at the Spectrum, and although Cunningham was not available, the team had the services of forward Johnny Green, a 4-time NBA All-Star in the 1960s and 1970s, to replace him.

After the season, head coach Alex Hannum resigned to take a position in the ABA, and Wilt Chamberlain was dealt to the Los Angeles Lakers for guard Archie Clark, center Darrall Imhoff, and forward Jerry Chambers (who never played with the team). Philadelphia would win only a single home playoff game from 1969 to 1971 (Game 6, 1971 playoffs vs. Baltimore), going 0–7 for the remaining home games from 1969 to 1971. It would be 9 seasons until they won a single post-season series.

Offseason

Regular season

Season standings

Record vs. opponents

Game log

Playoffs

|- align="center" bgcolor="#ccffcc"
| 1
| March 22
| New York
| W 118–110
| Wilt Chamberlain (37)
| Wilt Chamberlain (29)
| Wilt Chamberlain (7)
| Spectrum5,093
| 1–0
|- align="center" bgcolor="#ffcccc"
| 2
| March 23
| @ New York
| L 117–128
| Chamberlain, Greer (24)
| Wilt Chamberlain (17)
| Wilt Chamberlain (8)
| Madison Square Garden III15,911
| 1–1
|- align="center" bgcolor="#ccffcc"
| 3
| March 27
| New York
| W 138–132 (2OT)
| Chet Walker (32)
| Wilt Chamberlain (24)
| Wilt Chamberlain (8)
| Spectrum6,951
| 2–1
|- align="center" bgcolor="#ffcccc"
| 4
| March 30
| @ New York
| L 98–107
| Wilt Chamberlain (23)
| Wilt Chamberlain (27)
| Hal Greer (6)
| Madison Square Garden III18,262
| 2–2
|- align="center" bgcolor="#ccffcc"
| 5
| March 31
| New York
| W 123–105
| Hal Greer (38)
| Wilt Chamberlain (21)
| Chamberlain, Greer (7)
| Spectrum6,979
| 3–2
|- align="center" bgcolor="#ccffcc"
| 6
| April 1
| @ New York
| W 113–97
| Hal Greer (35)
| Wilt Chamberlain (27)
| Hal Greer (4)
| Madison Square Garden III18,014
| 4–2
|-

|- align="center" bgcolor="#ffcccc"
| 1
| April 5
| Boston
| L 118–127
| Wilt Chamberlain (33)
| Wilt Chamberlain (25)
| Chamberlain, Jones (5)
| Spectrum14,412
| 0–1
|- align="center" bgcolor="#ccffcc"
| 2
| April 10
| @ Boston
| W 115–106
| Wali Jones (24)
| Wilt Chamberlain (19)
| Wilt Chamberlain (8)
| Boston Garden14,780
| 1–1
|- align="center" bgcolor="#ccffcc"
| 3
| April 11
| Boston
| W 122–114
| Hal Greer (31)
| Wilt Chamberlain (25)
| Hal Greer (9)
| Spectrum15,102
| 2–1
|- align="center" bgcolor="#ccffcc"
| 4
| April 14
| @ Boston
| W 110–105
| Hal Greer (28)
| Wilt Chamberlain (16)
| Wilt Chamberlain (8)
| Boston Garden10,503
| 3–1
|- align="center" bgcolor="#ffcccc"
| 5
| April 15
| Boston
| L 104–122
| Wilt Chamberlain (28)
| Wilt Chamberlain (30)
| Wilt Chamberlain (7)
| Spectrum15,202
| 3–2
|- align="center" bgcolor="#ffcccc"
| 6
| April 17
| @ Boston
| L 106–114
| Hal Greer (40)
| Wilt Chamberlain (27)
| Wilt Chamberlain (8)
| Boston Garden14,780
| 3–3
|- align="center" bgcolor="#ffcccc"
| 7
| April 19
| Boston
| L 96–100
| Hal Greer (22)
| Wilt Chamberlain (34)
| Chamberlain, Greer (5)
| Spectrum15,202
| 3–4
|-

Awards and honors
Wilt Chamberlain, NBA leader, Assists
Wilt Chamberlain, NBA Most Valuable Player Award
Wilt Chamberlain, All-NBA First Team
Hal Greer, All-NBA Second Team

References

Philadelphia 76ers
Philadelphia 76ers seasons
Philadel
Philadel